Dale Campbell (born 17 January 1988) is a South African cricketer. He played in ten first-class and seven List A matches for Boland and Western Province from 2007 to 2013.

See also
 List of Boland representative cricketers

References

External links
 

1988 births
Living people
South African cricketers
Boland cricketers
Western Province cricketers
Cricketers from Cape Town